The Indianapolis Impalas (Indianapolis Rugby Football Club) are an American rugby union club founded in 1980. The Impalas are members of USA Rugby, and currently compete in Division 1 of the Midwest Rugby Football Union.

The Impalas advanced to the Final 16 of the National Championships in 2004.  In 2008–09 the Impalas claimed 3rd overall in the National Championships for Division 2; as a result of this success, the club moved up to Division 1.  In addition to the move, the club also formed a Division 3 team to debut in the 2009–10 season.

Club Honors
2004 DII Men's Club National Championship – 4th Place
2007–08 Southern League Division Champions of the Midwest DII Eastern Conference
2008–09 Southern League Division Champions of the Midwest DII Eastern Conference
2008–09 Midwest DII Eastern Conference Champions
2008–09 Midwest DII Co-Champions
2009 DII Men's Club National Championship – 3rd Place
2018-19 Midwest Rugby Football Union DIV Champions

See also
 Rugby Union in the United States
 USA Rugby
 Midwest Rugby Football Union
 Sports in Indianapolis
 Indianapolis

References

Rugby clubs established in 1980
Sports teams in Indianapolis
Rugby union teams in Indiana
1980 establishments in Indiana